Ricardo Ernesto Ahlf (born December 23, 1986 in Palmitos), known as Ricardo Ernesto, is a Brazilian footballer who currently plays for FC Cascavel.

References

1986 births
Living people
Brazilian footballers
Associação Chapecoense de Futebol players
Figueirense FC players
Fortaleza Esporte Clube players
Campeonato Brasileiro Série A players
Brazilian people of German descent

Association football midfielders